San Carlos is a community and census-designated place (CDP) in Hidalgo County, Texas. The population was 3,130 at the 2010 United States Census. It is part of the McAllen–Edinburg–Mission Metropolitan Statistical Area.

San Carlos is located northeast of McAllen.

Geography
San Carlos is located at  (26.297004, -98.069408).

San Carlos is five miles east of Edinburg and US Route 281 on State Highway 107. It is also about 12 miles north of the border of Mexico.

Demographics
As of the census of 2000, there were 2,650 people, 633 households, and 576 families residing in the CDP. The population density was 1,476.5 people per square mile (571.6/km2). There were 693 housing units at an average density of 386.1/sq mi (149.5/km2). The racial makeup of the CDP was 79.81% White, 0.30% African American, 17.17% from other races, and 2.72% from two or more races. Hispanic or Latino of any race were 97.06% of the population.

There were 633 households, out of which 61.9% had children under the age of 18 living with them, 73.1% were married couples living together, 12.2% had a female householder with no husband present, and 9.0% were non-families. 8.1% of all households were made up of individuals, and 3.2% had someone living alone who was 65 years of age or older. The average household size was 4.19 and the average family size was 4.39.

In the CDP, the population was spread out, with 40.6% under the age of 18, 12.9% from 18 to 24, 29.1% from 25 to 44, 12.1% from 45 to 64, and 5.3% who were 65 years of age or older. The median age was 23 years. For every 100 females, there were 101.2 males. For every 100 females age 18 and over, there were 99.0 males.

The median income for a household in the CDP was $14,524, and the median income for a family was $15,673. Males had a median income of $13,668 versus $13,843 for females. The per capita income for the CDP was $4,296. About 60.0% of families and 64.1% of the population were below the poverty line, including 72.4% of those under age 18 and 56.8% of those age 65 or over.

Education
Educationally, the community is served by the Edinburg Consolidated Independent School District.

Zoned elementary campuses serving sections include San Carlos Elementary School and John F. Kennedy Elementary School (grades PK-5), Middle schools serving sections of San Carlos include Harwell and Memorial. All residents are zoned to Edinburg High School (9-12).

In addition, South Texas Independent School District operates magnet schools that serve the community.

All of Hidalgo County is in the service area of South Texas College.

References

External links
 San Carlos Elementary School

Census-designated places in Hidalgo County, Texas
Census-designated places in Texas